Orrville is a city in Wayne County, Ohio, United States. It is about 9 miles east of Wooster and 20 miles southwest of Akron. The population was 8,452 at the 2020 census. It is part of the Wooster micropolitan area. The J.M. Smucker Company, manufacturer of the Smucker's food brand, is headquartered in Orrville.

History
Orrville was laid out in 1852, and named after Judge Smith Orr, proprietor. A post office called Orrville has been in operation since 1852.

Geography
Orrville is located at  (40.8414, −81.7715).

Demographics

2010 census
At the 2010 census there were 8,380 people, 3,337 households, and 2,273 families living in the city. The racial makeup of the city was 89.7% White, 4.9% African American, 0.1% Native American, 1.3% Asian, 1.3% from other races, and 2.6% from two or more races. Hispanic or Latino of any race were 3.5%.

Of the 3,337 households 32.5% had children under the age of 18 living with them, 49.9% were married couples living together, 13.8% had a female householder with no husband present, 4.5% had a male householder with no wife present, and 31.9% were non-families. 26.5% of households were one person and 11.9% were one person aged 65 or older. The average household size was 2.48 and the average family size was 2.96.

The median age was 39 years. 24.3% of residents were under the age of 18; 8.7% were between the ages of 18 and 24; 23.8% were from 25 to 44; 26.9% were from 45 to 64; and 16.1% were 65 or older. The gender makeup of the city was 48.7% male and 51.3% female.

2000 census
At the 2000 census there were 8,551 people, 3,305 households, and 2,343 families living in the city. The population density was 1,600.8 people per square mile (618.3/km). There were 3,489 housing units at an average density of 653.2 per square mile (252.3/km).  The racial makeup of the city was 90.89% White, 5.93% African American, 0.16% Native American, 1.15% Asian, 0.01% Pacific Islander, 0.51% from other races, and 1.34% from two or more races. Hispanic or Latino of any race were 1.29%.
Of the 3,305 households 35.2% had children under the age of 18 living with them, 54.4% were married couples living together, 12.2% had a female householder with no husband present, and 29.1% were non-families. 24.8% of households were one person and 10.0% were one person aged 65 or older. The average household size was 7.55 and the average family size was 3.04.

The age distribution was 27.6% under the age of 18, 8.4% from 18 to 24, 29.7% from 25 to 44, 21.2% from 45 to 64, and 13.1% 65 or older. The median age was 36 years. For every 100 females, there were 94.0 males. For every 100 females age 18 and over, there were 87.6 males.

The median household income was $36,500 and the median family income  was $46,728. Males had a median income of $32,565 versus $25,252 for females. The per capita income for the city was $17,419. About 5.7% of families and 7.7% of the population were below the poverty line, including 7.3% of those under age 18 and 8.2% of those age 65 or over.

Economy 

Orrville is the corporate headquarters for The J.M. Smucker Company and its fruit spread producing facility, which Smucker's asserts is the largest in the world. Other firms based in the city include Smith Dairy Products Company, Schantz Organ Company, The Will-Burt Company, And The Quality Castings Co.

Education 
Orrville City Schools, and Wayne College, which is a branch campus of The University of Akron, are both located in Orrville.

Notable people
Mike Birkbeck – Major League Baseball player for the Milwaukee Brewers and New York Mets, 
 Heber Blankenhorn – journalist and labor activist
 Tim Hiller – former standout quarterback at Western Michigan
 Bob Knight – former American college basketball head coach
 Mark Smucker – CEO of The J.M. Smucker Company

References

External links
 City website
 City of Orrville GIS information

Cities in Wayne County, Ohio
Cities in Ohio